Penicillium heteromorphum is a species of the genus of Penicillium.

References

heteromorphum
Fungi described in 1988